GFP Ramdir Sena is a militant Hindu nationalist group in Nepal.

The group's existence was first announced on 26 May 2008, when the group claimed responsibility for two bombings in Kathmandu. According to police, the bombings occurred outside a venue where the 1st Nepalese Constituent Assembly was set to meet to abolish Nepal's monarchy. Nobody was injured.

References

Rebel groups in Nepal
Terrorism in Nepal
Politics of Nepal
2008 establishments in Nepal